TTL may refer to:

Photography
 Through-the-lens metering, a camera feature
 Zenit TTL, an SLR film camera named for its TTL metering capability

Technology
 Time to live, a computer data lifespan-limiting mechanism
 Transistor–transistor logic, a family of integrated-circuit digital logic
 Differential TTL, a serial signaling standard based on TTL
 Turtle (syntax), a computer data format used in semantic web technologies

Other uses
 Taiwan Tobacco and Liquor, a state-owned manufacturer
 "TTL (Time to Love)", a single by South Korean girl group T-ara and boy band Supernova